Jacob Daniel Burbage (born September 27, 1992) is an American actor, writer, director, and musician. As an actor, he is best known for his role on Grounded for Life as Henry Finnerty. Burbage attended Moorestown Friends School and graduated in 2011. He later attended The College of New Jersey where he majored in English.

Career
Burbage played the role of youngest child Henry Finnerty for the first four seasons of Grounded for Life, but left the show at the end of season 4 to move back home to New Jersey. He has also guest starred in Sex and the City and was the original voice of Benny the Bull in the first four seasons of the Nickelodeon series Dora the Explorer.

He currently serves on the Executive Committee of Shakespeare 70, a non-professional theatre company in central New Jersey.

Filmography

Stage

References

External links
 
 Official website

Living people
1992 births
American male child actors
Male actors from New Jersey
Moorestown Friends School alumni
People from Delran Township, New Jersey
People from Willingboro Township, New Jersey
American male television actors
The College of New Jersey alumni